Francesco Guccini (born 14 June 1940) is an Italian singer-songwriter, considered one of the most important cantautori of his time. During the five decades of his music career he has recorded 16 studio albums and collections, and 6 live albums. He is also a writer, having published autobiographic and noir novels, and a comics writer. Guccini also worked as actor, soundtrack composer, lexicographer and dialectologist.

Guccini moved to Pàvana during World War II, then returned to Modena where he spent his teenage years and established his musical career. His debut album, Folk beat n. 1, was released in 1967, but the first success was in 1972 with the album Radici. He was harshly criticised after releasing Stanze di vita quotidiana, and answered his critics with the song "L'avvelenata". His studio albums production slowed down in the nineties and 2000s, but his live performances continued being successful.

His lyrics have been praised for their poetic and literary value and have been used in schools as an example of modern poetry. Guccini has gained the appreciation of critics and fans, who regard him as an iconic figure. He has received several awards for his works; an asteroid, a cactus species and a butterfly subspecies have been named after him. The main instrument in most of his songs is the acoustic guitar.

A leftist, though not a communist, Guccini dealt with political issues and more generally with the political climate of his time in some songs, such as "La Locomotiva" or "Eskimo".

Origins 
Guccini was born in 1940 in Modena, Italy. His father from Tuscany, Ferruccio Guccini, was a postal employee, and his mother from Emilia, Ester Prandi, was a housewife. While his father served in the Italian military during World War II, Guccini lived with his grandparents in a small village in the Apennine Mountains in northern Tuscany called Pàvana, where he spent his childhood. His years spent in the somewhat archaic society of the mountains of Central Italy was to be a strong inspiration throughout his career, and it became one of the key recurring themes of his songs and books.

When World War II had ended, Guccini moved back to his family in Modena. He studied at the Istituto Magistrale Carlo Sigonio, the same school Luciano Pavarotti had attended, earning his high school diploma in 1958. Guccini spent his teenage years in Modena, as he later recounted in his second novel Vacca d'un Cane and in songs including "Piccola Città", which paints a bitter portrait of the city as "a strange enemy".

Youth and musical beginnings 

Guccini's first job was as a teacher at a boarding school in Pesaro, but he was fired after a month and a half. He then worked as a journalist at the Gazzetta di Modena for two years. In April 1960, Guccini interviewed Domenico Modugno, who had just won two consecutive Sanremo Festivals. This inspired Guccini to write "L'antisociale", his first composition as a singer-songwriter.
In 1958 Guccini was guitarist and vocalist in a group first called Hurricanes, then Snakers and finally Gatti. The group included Pier Farri (drums), who would later become Guccini's producer; Victor Sogliani (saxophone), future member of Equipe 84; and Franco Fini Storchi (guitar). Guccini wrote his first songs while in the Snakers, in a style inspired by The Everly Brothers and Peppino di Capri. The group performed for two years, touring around Northern Italy and Switzerland. In 1961 the Guccini family moved to Bologna, and Francesco enrolled at the University of Bologna to study foreign languages. The next year he undertook mandatory military service, an experience he described as "substantially positive". When he returned to Bologna, Guccini was asked to join the band Equipe 84, but he declined to continue his studies. He later quit university just before taking his degree (he was conferred a degree honoris causa in science education in 2002). The band Cantacronache was an important influence in Guccini's artistic growth, as was Bob Dylan.

Debut (1967–1969) 
The song, though, was not selected for the event, and Guccini was embittered by the edits made by two lyricists engaged by CGD.
Guccini made his debut as a singer-songwriter in March 1967, with the album Folk beat n. 1, which received little commercial success. Three of the songs recorded for the album had previously been successes for Nomadi and Equipe 84: "Noi non-ci saremo", "L'antisociale" and "Auschwitz". The latter was translated and sung in English by Equipe 84, as well as by Rod MacDonald in his 1994 album Man on the Ledge. Another song from the album, "In morte di S.F.", later renamed "Canzone per un'amica", was recorded by Nomadi in 1968.  From 1965 onward, Guccini spent 20 years teaching Italian at the off-campus Dickinson College, in Bologna.

In May 1967 Guccini made his first appearance in television, on Diamoci del tu, hosted by Caterina Caselli and Giorgio Gaber singing "Auschwitz". He wrote several songs for Caselli and for Nomadi, who made his song "Dio è morto" become widely popular; it became one of his most famous songs, despite being censored by the RAI for blasphemy. In 1968 Francesco Guccini translated Simon & Garfunkel's hit song "Mrs. Robinson" into Italian; it was first covered in this version by the Italian beat group  and later was recorded by Bobby Solo on his LP Bobby Folk in 1970. In 1968 the 45 rpm record Un altro giorno è andato/Il bello was released; Guccini re-recorded the Side A song in an acoustic version for his 1970 album L'isola non-trovata. His first concert was held the same year at the La Cittadella Cultural Centre in Assisi.

1970s

In 1970 Guccini released his second album, Due anni dopo, recorded in the autumn of 1969. The main themes of the album are the passage of time and the analysis of everyday life in the context of bourgeois hypocrisy, with a noticeable influence from French music and from Leopardi's poetic style. After this album Guccini started his 10-year-long collaboration with folksinger Deborah Kooperman, who played fingerstyle guitar on it, a style mostly unknown in Italy at the time. Eleven months after Due anni dopo, the album L'isola non-trovata was released. The title was a literary reference to Guido Gozzano, and the song "La collina" contained a reference to J. D. Salinger. Guccini's fame began to spread beyond Bologna, partly thanks to the appearance in the TV show Speciale tre milioni, where he sang some of his songs and befriended Claudio Baglioni. In 1971 he married his long-time girlfriend Roberta Baccilieri, who was pictured on the back cover of his next album.

The turning point in Guccini's career was in 1972 thanks to the album Radici (roots), about the perpetual search for one's origins. This was also conveyed by the image on the front cover of the album, portraying Guccini's grandparents and their siblings next to their old mountain home. Radici contains some of his most renowned and popular songs, like "Incontro", "Piccola Città", "Il vecchio e il bambino", "La Canzone della bambina portoghese", "Canzone dei dodici mesi", and "La locomotiva", based on a real event and dealing with themes of equality, social justice and freedom, with a style similar to the anarchic music of the end of the 19th century. In the same year Guccini brought Claudio Lolli, a young singer-songwriter, to his record label, EMI Italiana. He later wrote two songs with him, "Keaton" and "Ballando con una sconosciuta".

In 1973 Guccini released Opera buffa, a light-hearted and playful album, which showed his skills as an ironic, theatrical and cultured cabaret artist. Guccini was perplexed by the release of the disc, especially because of its arrangements and because it was recorded live (with overdubs made in a recording studio). One year later Stanze di vita quotidiana was released, with a mixed reception by fans and critics. It included six long and melancholic songs, a mirror of the crisis Guccini faced, worsened by constant disagreements with his producer Pier Farri. Guccini received harsh criticism, including a slating by the critic Riccardo Bertoncelli, who said the singer songwriter was "a finished artist, who has nothing else to say". Guccini answered with the song "L'avvelenata", a few years later.

Guccini had his first commercial success in 1976, with Via Paolo Fabbri 43, which was the sixth best-selling album of the year. It was named after the address of the house in Bologna where he lived. He sang with a more mature and determined voice, and the musical structure was more complex than in his earlier works. The album contained "L'avvelenata", a bitter and colourful reply to the criticism he received for Stanze di vita quotidiana, which cited one of his critics, Riccardo Bertoncelli. Later Guccini was reluctant in performing the song during concerts, saying it was obsolete. 
The title track was an abstract description of Guccini's life in Bologna, which referenced Borges and Barthes; it also mentioned the "three heroines of Italian song", Alice, Marinella and Lilly, three women from songs by Italian singer-songwriters De Gregori, De André and Venditti. Other notable tracks were "Canzone quasi d'Amore", characterised by existential poetry, and "Il pensionato", about an old neighbour of Guccini, focusing on the sad psychological situation of some old people. Guccini's next album, Amerigo was released in 1978. The most popular song was "Eskimo", but Guccini claimed the highest point was the title track, a ballad about an emigrant uncle of his.
In 1977 the weekly magazine Grand Hotel featured Guccini on the cover titled "The father every teenager would have liked to have". Guccini did not endorse the article, which was based on an interview he did not know would be published, and commented: "I cannot understand how they chose that title, I write songs for an audience of people in their thirties, I do not see how an audience of sixteen year olds fresh out of school could relate with the things I say". In the same year, Guccini separated from his wife Roberta (the song "Eskimo" is about this event), and started cohabitating with Angela. In 1978 they had a daughter, Teresa, to whom the songs "Culodritto" and "E un giorno..." are dedicated. In 1979 the live album Album concerto, recorded in a concert with Nomadi, was released. It was peculiar because the songs were performed in duet with Augusto Daolio, and because it included previously unreleased songs: "Dio è morto", "Noi", and "Per fare un uomo".

1980s 

The first album released by Guccini in the eighties was Metropolis, which was characterised by the description of cities with a symbolic value: Byzantium, Venice, Bologna and Milan. Their histories mingle with the distress caused by life in the city and with symbolic references. The album had richer arrangements, with saxophones, bass guitars, drums, clarinets, flutes and zufoli. Byzantium is described by Guccini as a fascinating yet oppressive city at the crossroads of two continents and two eras. The song is set at the time of Emperor Justinian I (483–565), and there are many historical references to that period, that have been explained by Guccini himself. The narrator, Filemazio, who some critics believe to be a fictionalized Guccini, senses the decadence of his civilization and the coming of the end. The song was praised by critic Paolo Jachia, who described it as "moving and dreamlike". In 1981 Guccini was the co-author, along with Giorgio Gaber, Sandro Luporini and Gian Piero Alloisio, of the musical Gli ultimi viaggi di Gulliver. The eponymous song "Gulliver" was then included in Guccini's next album, Guccini, which dealt with the same themes found in Metropolis. Notable songs in the album include "Shomèr ma mi llailah?" ("Watchman, what of the night?", from ), "Autogrill", about a love only dreamt of, and "Inutile", which narrates a day two lovers spent in Rimini. The subsequent tour was the first in which Guccini performed with a backing band; previously, Guccini used to perform solo, or with just one or two guitarists. In 1984 the live album Fra la via Emilia e il West was released. It included live versions of many of his popular songs, recorded mainly at a concert held in Piazza Maggiore in Bologna, in which several guests performed alongside Guccini: Giorgio Gaber, Paolo Conte, I Nomadi, Roberto Vecchioni and Equipe 84.

In 1987 the album Signora Bovary was released. Several of the songs portray people from Guccini's life: "Van Loon" is his father, "Culodritto" is his daughter Teresa, and "Signora Bovary" is himself. Other songs include "Keaton", written with his friend Claudio Lolli, and "Scirocco", an award-winning song about an episode in the life of the poet Adriano Spatola, a friend of Guccini. In 1988 the singer-songwriter released a live album, ...quasi come Dumas..., which included some of his songs from the Sixties, in a rearranged version. The title is a homage to Twenty Years After, the novel by Alexandre Dumas.

1990s 
In 1990 Guccini released Quello che non..., which continued in the style of Signora Bovary. Songs included in the album are "Quello che non" and "La canzone delle domande consuete", which received the Club Tenco best song of the year award. Three years later, he released Parnassius Guccinii referencing a subspecies of butterfly which was named in his honour. The song "Farewell", included in the album, is a homage to Bob Dylan's "Farewell, Angelina", featuring its instrumental introduction and citing a verse ("The triangle tingles, and the trumpet plays slow"). The literary critic Paolo Jachia commented: "Guccini's enormous poetic and cultural effort has been opening the best tradition of Italian poetry to Dylan-esque ballads". Other songs included in the album are "Canzone per Silvia", dedicated to Silvia Baraldini, and "Acque", composed for Tiziano Sclavi's movie Nero.

It was three years until he released his next album, D'amore di morte e di altre sciocchezze, which achieved significant commercial success. Tracks included are "Cirano", inspired by the play Cyrano de Bergerac; "Quattro stracci", about the ending of the relationship with Angela (the same woman to whom Farewell was dedicated); "Stelle" about the feelings of powerlessness men feel when looking at the starry night sky; "Vorrei", dedicated to his new partner, Raffaella Zuccari, and "I Fichi", a farcical song.

2000s 
Stagioni was Guccini's first album of the 2000s. The key theme is the passage of time and the different temporal cycles connected to it. Songs included are "Autunno", "Ho ancora la forza" (with Ligabue), "Don Chisciotte", in which Guccini takes the role of Don Quixote, and his guitarist that of Sancho Panza), and "Addio", a song akin to "L'avvelenata". The album and its tour were successful, with the unexpected presence of many young people among the audience, establishing Guccini as an iconic artist for three generations. A special limited edition vinyl version of Stagioni was also released.

In 2004 Guccini released Ritratti. Some of the songs contained in the album are imagined dialogues with historical figures, such as Odysseus, Christopher Columbus and Che Guevara. The first track of the album, "Odysseus", is on the theme of travel, and contains references to the Odyssey, to Dante (Canto 26 of Inferno), and to a poem by Foscolo. Another song in the album, "Piazza Alimonda", is about the death of Carlo Giuliani during the demonstrations at the G8 summit in Genoa. Ritratti received critical acclaim and commercial success, reaching the number one spot in the FIMI Albums Chart, holding it for two weeks, and remaining in the chart for eighteen weeks. In the same year, lyrics from "Canzone per Piero" were included in a final upper secondary school exam"; Guccini claimed he was "embarrassed and glad" about being alongside Cicero and Raphael.
In 2005 the live double-album Anfiteatro Live, recorded in the amphitheatre in Cagliari, was released; it also included a DVD of the concert. Anfiteatro Live was a commercial success, holding the number one spot in the FIMI Chart for one month, and remaining in the chart for twenty-two weeks. In 2006 Guccini received one vote in the 2006 Italian presidential election. The same year, the triple-album The Platinum Collection, containing 47 songs, was released as a celebration of his fortieth year as a musical artist. In October Guccini's official biography, Portavo allora un Eskimo innocente by Massimo Cotto, was published.

On 21 April 2008, an article on La Stampa affirmed that Guccini had stopped smoking, and that this had caused him to gain weight and lose his inspiration. He denied it on 18 May 2008, in TV show Che tempo che fa. In 2010 the Mondadori published Non so che viso avesse, a book which contains a Guccini autobiography and, in the second part of the book, a critical essay edited by Alberto Bertoni. Luciano Ligabue, friend and colleague of Guccini, entitled him a song, "Caro il mio Francesco"  on his album Arrivederci, mostro!. On 28 September 2010 the collection Storia di altre storie  was released, with songs selected by Guccini himself. In the same year the botanist Davide Donati named a new species of Mexican cactus, the Corynopuntia guccinii, after him. In the article about the discovery on the botanical magazine Piante Grasse, Donati explained that he discovered the unknown plant whilst listening to Guccini's "Incontro", adding: "I could not have named it after anyone else". On 25 April 2011, Guccini married for the second time , with Raffaella Zuccari, who had been his partner in the last fifteen years.

Style

Guccini's lyrical and poetic style has been praised by many, including famous authors and singer-songwriters. Fellow singer-songwriter Roberto Vecchioni said about Guccini: "he's not a singer of stories, he's a singer of thoughts and a singer of doubts", while Nobel Prize winner Dario Fo called him a "voice of truth".

Despite the length of his career, there are some defining characteristics, such as the use of different registers, the literary references to several writers, and the use of a variety of themes to reach moral conclusions. His lyrics frequently have a metaphysical tone and existential motifs, and are often centered around portrayals of people and events. Guccini's voice is baritonal, with a noticeable rhotacism. Most of his songs, especially early in his career, are folk rock.

Guccini has been seen as a sociopolitical chronicler and some of his songs express his opinion about a political issue. In "La primavera di Praga", he expressed criticism of the Sovietic occupation of Czechoslovakia in 1968 , and "Piccola storia ignobile" supported the Italian abortion law. "Canzone per Silvia" was dedicated to Silvia Baraldini, and both "Canzone per il Che" and "Stagioni" were dedicated to Che Guevara. "Piazza Alimonda" was about the riots at the G8 summit in Genoa and "La locomotiva" was about the anarchic Pietro Rigosi running a locomotive at full steam towards death.

Guccini defines himself an anarchic, and he expressed his thoughts about the relation between music and politics in his song "L'avvelenata"; "I have never said that with songs you can make revolutions, nor that you can make poetry."("però non ho mai detto che a canzoni si fan rivoluzioni, si possa far poesia.")

Books 

In his career as a writer, Guccini published several novels and essays, experimenting with different genres. His first novel, Cròniche Epafàniche, was published by Feltrinelli in 1989, and was one of his most successful works. Even though it is not explicitly an autobiography, it can be considered the first of three autobiographical books. It describes past events of Pàvana, the town where he spent his childhood. Guccini recounts stories he heard from elderly people living on the Tuscan Apennines; critics praised the "philological accuracy" of the book.
His next two novels, Vacca d'un cane and Cittanòva blues were also bestsellers, and covered different periods of his life. Vacca d'un cane depicts a teenage Guccini in Modena, as he realizes that the city's provincialism will be an obstacle to his intellectual growth, while Cittanòva Blues the last part of his trio of autobiographical books, tells of his time in Bologna, seen as a "little Paris".
Guccini also collaborated with Loriano Macchiavelli for a series of Noir books, and published a Dictionary of the dialect of Pàvana which showed his ability as dialectologist and translator.

Guccini has also worked as a comics writer. He is a lover of comics, and some of his songs reference them. He's been author and script writer of comics, such as Vita e morte del brigante Bobini detto "Gnicche", illustrated by Francesco Rubino, Lo sconosciuto, illustrated by Magnus, and Cronache di spazio profondo, drawn by his friend Bonvi.

Cinema 
Guccini's first experience as actor was in the 1976 movie Fantasia, ma non-troppo, per violino, directed by Gianfranco Mingozzi, in which he played Giulio Cesare Croce, a poet who narrates the history of Bologna. He then appeared in: I giorni cantati, a 1979 movie directed by Paolo Pietrangeli, which featured two of Guccini's songs in its soundtrack, "Eskimo" and "Canzone di notte n°2"; Musica per vecchi animali, a 1989 movie directed by Umberto Angelucci and Stefano Benni; Radiofreccia, the 1998 directorial debut of singer-songwriter Luciano Ligabue; Ormai è fatta, the 1999 movie directed by Enzo Monteleone. In the 2000s he acted in three movies directed by Leonardo Pieraccioni, Ti amo in tutte le lingue del mondo (2005), Una moglie bellissima (2007) and Io & Marilyn (2009). Guccini wrote the soundtrack of the 1977 movie Nenè, directed by Salvatore Samperi, and his song "Acque" featured in the soundtrack of Nero, the 1992 movie directed by Giancarlo Soldi.

Awards 

Awards, accolades and recognitions received by Guccini:
 In 1992 he received the Librex Montale Award "Poetry for Music", for the song "Canzone delle domande consuete".
 In 1992, new subspecies of butterfly on the Tuscan-Emilian Apennines, was named Parnassius mnemosyne guccinii in his honor.
 In 1997 Luciano Tesi and Gabriele Cattani discovered an asteroid, naming it 39748 Guccini.
 In 2001 his story "La Cena" was included in the anthology "Racconti italiani del Novecento" (I Meridiani – Mondadori).
 In 2002 the universities of Bologna, Modena and Reggio Emilia awarded him an honorary degree in Science of Education
 In 2003 the comune of Carpi celebrated Guccini's fortieth year of career dedicating him the show "Stagioni di vita quotidiana".
 In 2004 Carlo Azeglio Ciampi awarded him the title of Officer of the Order of Merit of the Italian Republic.
 In 2004 he received the Targa Ferré, the award named after Léo Ferré.
 In 2005 he received the award "Giuseppe Giacosa – Parole per la musica".
 In 2007, in Catanzaro, he was awarded the "Riccio d'argento" for Best Singer-Songwriter Live Album.
 In 2008, in Carpi, he received the Arturo Loria award for his book of short stories Icaro.
 In 2010 the botanist Davide Donati discovered a new species of cactus, naming it Corynopuntia guccinii.
 In 2012 he was awarded with an honorary degree by the American University of Rome.

From the Club Tenco:
 1975 –  Premio Tenco, career award along with Fausto Amodei, Umberto Bindi, Fabrizio De André, Vinicius de Moraes, Enzo Jannacci.
 1987 – Targa Tenco for the song "Scirocco".
 1990 – Targa Tenco for the song "La canzone delle domande consuete".
 1994 – Targa Tenco for the album Parnassius Guccinii.
 2000 – Targa Tenco for the song "Ho ancora la forza".

Awards won in collaboration with Loriano Macchiavelli:
 In 1997 Guccini and Macchiavelli received the Alassio Literary Award, Un libro per l'Europa, for the book Macaronì: romanzo di santi e delinquenti.
 In 1998 Guccini and Macchiavelli won the 4th annual "Police Film Festival" in Bologna for the book Macaronì: romanzo di santi e delinquenti.
 In 2007 Guccini and Macchiavelli won an award at the "Serravalle Noir 2007" for their novel Tango e gli altri – romanzo di una raffica, anzi tre.

Discography 
 1967 – Folk beat n. 1
 1970 – Due anni dopo
 1970 – L'isola non-trovata
 1972 – Radici
 1973 – Opera buffa
 1974 – Stanze di vita quotidiana
 1976 – Via Paolo Fabbri 43
 1978 – Amerigo
 1979 – Album concerto (live with Nomadi)
 1981 – Metropolis
 1983 – Guccini
 1984 – Fra la via Emilia e il West (live)
 1987 – Signora Bovary
 1988 – ...quasi come Dumas... (live)
 1990 – Quello che non...
 1993 – Parnassius Guccinii
 1996 – D'amore di morte e di altre sciocchezze
 1998 – Guccini Live Collection (live)
 2000 – Stagioni
 2001 – Francesco Guccini Live @ RTSI (live)
 2004 – Ritratti
 2005 – Anfiteatro Live (live)
 2006 – The Platinum Collection
 2010 – Storia di altre storie
 2012 – L'ultima Thule
 2015 – Se io avessi Previsto Tutto Questo... La Strada, Gli Amici, Le Canzoni 
 2017 – L'ostaria delle dame
 2019 – Note di viaggio

Bibliography

 Cròniche epafàniche (1991)
 Al Fatâz di Zardén Margarétta (1992)
 Vacca d'un cane (1993)
 Storie d'inverno (1994, with Giorgio Celli and Valerio Manfredi)
 Novecento e Novecento (1995)
 Le parole del mugnaio a Pàvana e nella montagna fra Bologna e Pistoia (1995)
 Macaronì (1998, with Loriano Macchiavelli)
 Dizionario del dialetto di Pàvana
 Un disco dei Platters (1999, with Loriano Macchiavelli)
 Questo sangue che impasta la terra (2001, with Loriano Macchiavelli)
 Storia di altre storie (2001, with Vincenzo Cerami)
 Lo spirito e altri briganti (2002, with Loriano Macchiavelli)
 Cittanòva blues (2003)
 La legge del bar e altre comiche (2005)
 L'uomo che reggeva il cielo (2005)
 Tango e gli altri, romanzo di una raffica anzi tre (2007, with Loriano Macchiavelli)
 Icaro (2008)
 Non so che viso avesse (2008)
 Malastagione (2011, with Loriano Macchiavelli)

Comics
 Storie dello spazio profondo (1975, with Bonvi)
 Poche ore all'alba (1975, with Magnus)
 Vita e morte del brigante Bobino detto Gnicche (1980, with Francesco Rubino)
 Barbùn vs. Realtà (1981, with Filippo Scozzari)
 Gerry Pompa (1983, with Massimo Cavezzali)

Filmography
 Bologna. Fantasia, ma non-troppo, per violino (1976, actor)
 Nenè (1977, soundtrack)
 I giorni cantati (1979, actor as himself and soundtrack)
 Le lunghe ombre (1987, actor)
 Musica per vecchi animali (1989, actor)
 Nero (1992, soundtrack)
 Radiofreccia (1998, actor)
 Ormai è fatta (1999, actor)
 Il segreto del successo (1999, actor as himself)
 I Love You in Every Language in the World (2006, actor)
 A Beautiful Wife (2007, actor)
 Me and Marilyn (2009, actor)

Footnotes

External links 

Official Site – Official site, including touring schedule 
Unofficial Site with english translations of lyrics  
Unofficial Site with news and lyrics  

1940 births
Living people
Musicians from Modena
20th-century Italian novelists
20th-century Italian male writers
21st-century Italian novelists
Italian singer-songwriters
21st-century Italian male writers
Musicians from Bologna
People of Tuscan descent